The Last Song may refer to:

Film, television, and literature
 The Last Song (1980 film), an American television film directed by Alan J. Levi
 The Last Song (2010 film), an adaptation of a novel by Nicholas Sparks, directed by Julie Anne Robinson
 The Last Song (TV series), a British television series written by Carla Lane
 The Last Song (novel), a 2009 novel by Nicholas Sparks

Songs
 "Last Song" (Edward Bear song), 1972
 "Last Song" (Gackt song), 2003
 "The Last Song" (The All-American Rejects song), 2002
 "The Last Song" (Brian Wilson song), 2015
 "The Last Song" (Elton John song), 1992
 "The Last Song" (Luv' song), 1991
 "The Last Song" (Poison song), 2000
 "The Last Song" (X Japan song), 1998
 "Last Song", by Carpark North from Grateful, 2008
 "Last Song", by Marianne Faithfull from Before the Poison, 2005
 "Last Song", by Meredith Monk from Impermanence, 2008
 "The Last Song", by Foo Fighters from In Your Honor, 2005
 "The Last Song", by Hilary Duff from Hilary Duff, 2004
 "The Last Song", by Iggy Azalea from Ignorant Art, 2011
 "The Last Song", by JLS from Outta This World, 2010
 "The Last Song", by McFly from Radio:Active, 2008
 "The Last Song", by Rihanna from Rated R, 2009
 "The Last Song", by Sevendust from Next, 2005
 "The Last Song", by the Smashing Pumpkins, a B-side of the single "Thirty-Three", 1996
 "The Last Song", by Theory of a Deadman from Theory of a Deadman, 2002